610 Valeska is a minor planet orbiting the Sun. Discovered in 1906 by Max Wolf. The origin of the name is unknown, but it may be related to the provisional designation 1906 VK. In Slavic origin, it also means Glorious ruler.

References

External links
 
 

Background asteroids
Valeska
Valeska
19060926